Chris Spencer is the vocalist and guitarist of the noise rock band Unsane, based in New York City. He also was vocalist and guitarist of the band The Cutthroats 9, when he moved to California after Unsane went on hiatus in 2000. He recently formed the sludge metal band Celan, along with composer/keyboardist Ari Benjamin Meyers.

References 

Year of birth missing (living people)
Living people
American male singers
Unsane members
Guitarists from North Carolina
American male guitarists
Human Impact members